She Loved a Fireman is a 1937 film directed by John Farrow and starring Dick Foran and Ann Sheridan.

It was also known as I Loved a Fireman and Two Platoons.

Plot
Red Taylor becomes a fireman at a station captained by Captain Shannon.

Cast
Dick Foran as James 'Red' Taylor
Ann Sheridan as Marjorie 'Margie' Shannon 
Robert Armstrong as Capt. Smokey Shannon
Eddie Acuff as Skillet Michaels
Veda Ann Borg as Betty Williams

Production
The film was based on an original story by Charleton Sand. Dick Foran star of Warners' B Westerns was given the lead role and John Farrow assigned to direct. Filming started 29 June 1937.

Reception
"Our advice would be to look around for the nearest exit", said the New York Times.

References

External links

Complete film at BFI

Complete film at Internet Archive

1937 films
Films directed by John Farrow
Warner Bros. films
American black-and-white films
1930s action films
American action films
1937 romantic drama films
American romantic drama films
1930s American films